Gyropidae is a family of lice in the order Psocodea. There are about 9 genera and more than 90 described species in Gyropidae.

Genera
These nine genera belong to the family Gyropidae:
 Abrocomophaga Emerson & Price, 1976
 Aotiella Eichler, 1949
 Gliricola Mjoberg, 1910
 Gyropus Nitzsch, 1818
 Macrogyropus Ewing, 1924
 Monothoracius Werneck, 1934
 Phtheiropoios Eichler, 1940
 Pitrufquenia Marelli, 1932
 Protogyropus Ewing, 1924

References

Further reading

 

Troctomorpha
Lice
Insect families